National Secondary Route 218, or just Route 218 (or ) is a National Road Route of Costa Rica, located in the San José, Cartago provinces.

Description
In San José province the route covers San José canton (Carmen, Catedral districts), Goicoechea canton (Guadalupe, San Francisco, Ipís, Rancho Redondo, Purral districts).

In Cartago province the route covers Cartago canton (San Nicolás, Llano Grande districts).

References

Highways in Costa Rica